Scott Moore (born 23 January 1988) is an English rugby league footballer who plays as a  for the Swinton Lions in the Betfred Championship.

He previously played in the Super League for St Helens (Heritage № 1145), Huddersfield Giants, London Broncos, Castleford Tigers (Heritage № 885), and in the NRL for the North Queensland Cowboys. Moore signed for Swinton in the Betfred Championship, after starting the season at the Rochdale Hornets for the 2019 season, following his release from prison.

Playing career

Club career

St Helens
Moore was the youngest ever Super League player when he made his début for Saints at the JJB Stadium aged only 16.

Castleford Tigers
Moore spent 2008 on loan at Castleford.

Huddersfield Giants
He spent 2009 on loan at Huddersfield whilst playing hooker. In 2009, Moore was named in the Super League team of the year at Hooker.

St Helens - Return from loans
Moore returned to St Helens for the start of the 2010 season. Moore played in the 2011 Super League Grand Final defeat against Leeds at Old Trafford.

Widnes Vikings
On 11 October 2011, it was announced that Moore has signed a three-year deal commencing in 2012 with English Super League side Widnes. On Friday 17 February 2012, Widnes Vikings announced they had suspended Moore, Hep Cahill and Simon Finnigan for an unspecified breach of club discipline, so missing the match against Salford City Reds on Sunday 19 February 2012. On 12 April 2012, Moore was sacked by Widnes for a further breach of discipline.

Huddersfield Giants
On 17 April 2012, Scott signed for Huddersfield until the end of the season.

North Queensland Cowboys
In early November 2012 it was announced that Moore had signed a two-year-contract with the North Queensland Cowboys.

London Broncos
In mid January 2014, the London Broncos announced they signed Moore for the 2014 season where he was their starting hooker.

Castleford Tigers
Following the Broncos relegation from Super League he signed a deal with the Castleford from the 2015 season.

Wakefield Trinity Wildcats loan
Moore was loaned to Wakefield Trinity Wildcats in 2015, with Paul McShane going in the opposite direction.

Wakefield Trinity permanent
He later signed a permanent deal for the 2016 season with Wakefield Trinity.

Bradford Bulls
Moore signed for Bradford on a four-game trial. This turned into a year full time deal. However at the end of the season Moore was released.

Swinton Lions
On 19 June 2019 it was reported that he had signed for Swinton in the RFL Championship in a swap deal with Kyle Shelford

International career
Moore made his test début for England in 2009, playing two games.

Personal life
On 6 March 2018 Moore was jailed for 23 months at Bolton Crown Court for dangerous driving and assaulting three police officers.

References

External links
(archived by web.archive.org) Bradford Bulls profile
(archived by web.archive.org) Cas Tigers profile
(archived by web.archive.org) Moore  Joins The Vikings
(archived by web.archive.org) Saints profile
(archived by web.archive.org) Cas profile
Coach defends Moore début
Young duo extend St Helens deals
St Helens 18–10 Hull
Long hails his unbeaten St Helens
St Helens 48–12 Huddersfield
Saints Heritage Society profile

1988 births
Living people
Bradford Bulls captains
Bradford Bulls players
British people convicted of assault
Castleford Tigers players
England national rugby league team players
English rugby league players
Huddersfield Giants players
London Broncos players
North Queensland Cowboys players
Northern Pride RLFC players
Rochdale Hornets players
Rugby league halfbacks
Rugby league hookers
Rugby league players from St Helens, Merseyside
St Helens R.F.C. players
Swinton Lions players
Wakefield Trinity players
Widnes Vikings players